The canton of Le Nord-Gironde is an administrative division of the Gironde department, southwestern France. It was created at the French canton reorganisation which came into effect in March 2015. Its seat is in Saint-André-de-Cubzac.

It consists of the following communes:
 
Cavignac
Cézac
Civrac-de-Blaye
Cubnezais
Cubzac-les-Ponts
Donnezac
Gauriaguet
Générac
Laruscade
Marcenais
Marsas
Périssac
Peujard
Saint-André-de-Cubzac
Saint-Christoly-de-Blaye
Saint-Genès-de-Fronsac
Saint-Gervais
Saint-Girons-d'Aiguevives
Saint-Laurent-d'Arce
Saint-Mariens
Saint-Savin
Saint-Vivien-de-Blaye
Saint-Yzan-de-Soudiac
Saugon
Val-de-Virvée
Virsac

References

Cantons of Gironde